Saint Thomas More Hospital, commonly styled as St. Thomas More Hospital, is the main hospital for Cañon City and the surrounding area in Fremont County, Colorado. It is owned by Centura Health, the largest health care system in Colorado.

History
Saint Thomas More Hospital has evolved from a small local hospital in the downtown area to a thriving medical center in northern Cañon City. The hospital was started in 1938 and celebrated its 75th anniversary on November 16, 2013.

Services
Saint Thomas More Hospital is a full-service hospital. The facility features a birth center, emergency services, and an intensive care unit.

References

External links
Hospital website

Hospital buildings completed in 1838
Hospitals in Colorado
Buildings and structures in Cañon City, Colorado
1938 establishments in Colorado